The hexaperchloratoaluminate ion is a triple negative complex of perchlorate with aluminium. It is related to hexanitratoaluminate and tetraperchloratoaluminate all of which are highly oxidising energetic materials.

Solid materials that have been produced in this series of hexaperchloratoaluminate salts are lithium hexaperchloratoaluminate, ammoniumhexaperchloratoaluminate, tetramethylammonium hexaperchloratoaluminate, and trinitroniumhexaperchloratoaluminate .

Preparation
The hexaperchloratoaluminates can be prepared in liquid sulfur dioxide at −10 °C from aluminium trichloride combining with various perchlorates.

3 NO2ClO4 + 3 Li3ClO4 + AlCl3 → 3 NO2Cl + Li3Al(ClO4)6

3 NO2ClO4 + 3 (NH4)ClO4 + AlCl3 → 3 NO2Cl + (NH4)3Al(ClO4)6

6 NO2ClO4 + AlCl3 → 3 NO2Cl + (NO2)3Al(ClO4)6
Aluminium nitrate can be heated at 125 °C with nitrosonium or nitronium perchlorate to yield hexaperchloratoaluminates.

10–14 NOClO4 + Al(NO3)3 → 3 NO2Cl + (NO2)3Al(ClO4)6

6–10 NO2ClO4 + Al(NO3)3 → 3 NO2Cl + (NO2)3Al(ClO4)6

3 NO2ClO4 + 3 K3ClO4 + AlCl3 → 3 NO2Cl + K3Al(ClO4)6

Potassium hexaperchloratoaluminate may or may not exist. Hydrazinium hexaperchloratoaluminate can only be made in an impure form with 

3 NO2ClO4 + 3 (NH2H5)ClO4 + AlCl3 → 3 NO2Cl + (NH2H5)3Al(ClO4)6

Guanidinium hexaperchloratoaluminate can be made via:
3 NO2ClO4 + 3 C(NH2)3ClO4 + AlCl3 → 3 NO2Cl + (C(NH2)3)3Al(ClO4)6

References

Perchlorates
Aluminium complexes
Anions